100 is a 2008 Filipino film starring Mylene Dizon who portrays the role of a woman terminally-ill with cancer and had about 100 days or about three months to live. She set for herself various tasks to accomplish in her final days. The film was written and directed by Chris Martinez.

In 2010, it was named as one of the top 10 films released in 2009 by ABS-CBN News.

Cast 
Mylene Dizon as Joyce De Leon
Eugene Domingo as Ruby
Tessie Tomas as Eloisa 
TJ Trinidad as Rod 
Ryan Eigenmann as Emil
Simon Ibarra as Gilbert
Cecile Paz as Me-an

Production

Critical response

Accolades

References

External links 

2008 films
Cinemalaya films
Films directed by Chris Martinez
English-language Filipino films
English-language Philippine films
Philippine drama films
2000s Tagalog-language films
2008 drama films
2000s English-language films
2008 multilingual films
Philippine multilingual films